American mammal may refer to:

 Mammals of North America
 Mammals of Central America
 Mammals of South America